Catoria is a genus of moths in the family Geometridae.

Selected species
 Catoria camelaria (Guenée, 1857)
 Catoria delectaria (Walker, 1866)
 Catoria hemiprosopa (Turner, 1904)
 Catoria olivescens Moore, 1888
 Catoria proicyrta (Prout, 1932)
 Catoria sublavaria (Guenée, 1857)
 Catoria tamsi Prout, 1929

References

External links
 
 
 Catoria at Markku Savela's Lepidoptera and Some Other Life Forms
 Natural History Museum Lepidoptera genus database

Boarmiini